Wu Jing may refer to:

People
Wu Jing (Han dynasty) (died 203), military general under the warlord Sun Jian during the late Han dynasty
Wu Jing (mathematician) (15th century), Ming dynasty mathematician
Wu Jin (1934–2008), or Wu Jing, Taiwanese educator
Wu Jing (actress) (born 1949), Chinese actress
Wu Jing (actor) (born 1974), Chinese actor

Other uses
Five Classics, or Wu Jing, a collection of ancient Confucian books
People's Armed Police, or Wu Jing, a paramilitary force of the People's Republic of China

See also
Wu Ching (disambiguation)
Wujing (disambiguation)